Eriphioides tractipennis is a moth of the subfamily Arctiinae. It was described by Arthur Gardiner Butler in 1876. It is found in Nicaragua, Guatemala and Panama.

References

 Arctiidae genus list at Butterflies and Moths of the World of the Natural History Museum

Arctiinae
Moths described in 1876